D'Apuzzo is an Italian surname. Notable people with the surname include:

Adam D'Apuzzo (born 1986), Australian association footballer
David D'Apuzzo (born 1988), Australian association footballer
Nick D'Apuzzo, American aircraft designer

See also
Apuzzo

Italian-language surnames